St. Rose Hospital is an independent, non-profit hospital located in Hayward, California. It is a designated cardiac arrest receiving center in the Alameda County emergency medical services system, and provides basic emergency medical services.

History 
The hospital opened in 1962. It has dedicated itself to treating some of the poorest and sickest patients of the East Bay since its inception. In 2012 it was nearly bankrupt but was bailed out with $12 million from the county of Alameda, Kaiser Permanente, and others. With Kaiser Hayward planning a relocation to San Leandro, St. Rose will be the only hospital in the city. The hospital considered plans to either be taken over by Alameda County Medical Center, or Lex Reddy, formerly with the embattled Prime Healthcare Services, and the brother-in-law of Prem Reddy. Reddy's firm, Alecto Healthcare Services, began managing St. Rose in 2013.

On June 11, 2020, a COVID-19 outbreak was reported at the hospital infecting 37 healthcare workers.

See also

References

External links

This hospital in the CA Healthcare Atlas A project by OSHPD
State of California Department of Health Care Services audit

Hospital buildings completed in 1962
Buildings and structures in Hayward, California
Hospitals in the San Francisco Bay Area
Hospitals in Alameda County, California
Hospitals established in 1962
1962 establishments in California